Upír z Feratu, also known as Ferat Vampire is a 1982 Czechoslovak horror film directed by Juraj Herz. The name is a pun on Upír Nosferatu, or Nosferatu the Vampire.

Plot

Doctor Marek (Jiří Menzel) is shocked when his beloved nurse, Mima (Dagmar Veškrnová), signs a contract with foreign car manufacturer Ferat to work as a rally-driver. Rumors abound that the Ferat sports car runs not on petrol, but on human blood.

Cast
 Jiří Menzel as Dr. Marek
 Dagmar Veškrnová as Mima
 Jana Břežková as Luisa / Klára
 Petr Čepek as Kříž
 Jan Schmid as Dr. Kaplan
 Zdenka Procházková as Madame Ferat

Production

The Ferat rally car used in the film was, in fact, a prototype for an unrealized sports model Škoda 110 Super Sport produced by Škoda Auto, now generally referred to as the Škoda Super Sport 'Ferat Vampir RSR' in homage to the film. This car white coloured also play a small role in Tomorrow I'll Wake Up and Scald Myself with Tea.

See also
 Blood Car, another film about a car that uses blood for fuel
 Road Kill, a film about a road train that uses a pulp made by grinding human bodies for fuel
 Blood Drive, a TV series centered on a road race with cars that use blood for fuel

External links
 
 Youtube clip of the film
 Screenshots of various cars used in the film

1982 horror films
1980s science fiction horror films
1982 films
Czechoslovak science fiction horror films
1980s Czech-language films
Films directed by Juraj Herz
Films scored by Petr Hapka
1980s Czech films